The Fort Street Historic District in Boise, Idaho, contains roughly 47 blocks located within the 1867 plat of Boise City. The irregular shape of the district is roughly bounded on the north by West Fort Street and on the south by West State Street. The west boundary is North 16th Street, and the east boundary is roughly North 5th Street.

When the nomination form was prepared in 1982 for the National Register of Historic Places (NRHP), the district contained 318 buildings. The inventory consisted mostly of houses, but schools, churches, and commercial structures were included. Many structures were designed by Tourtellotte & Hummel, and some were designed by Wayland & Fennell. The district contains many sites with individual NRHP listing, and the Boise High School Campus and the St. John's Cathedral Block both are separately listed and contain multiple structures within the larger Fort Street Historic District. The district is itself contained within a larger area known locally as Boise's North End Preservation District, although the North End includes other NRHP listed historic districts.

Partial list of contributing properties

References

External links

Buildings and structures in Boise, Idaho
National Register of Historic Places in Ada County, Idaho